Miss Universe Vietnam (Vietnamese: Hoa hậu Hoàn vũ Việt Nam) is a biennial (two-year frequent) national beauty pageant in Vietnam to select the country's representative to the Miss Universe, one of the Big Four major international beauty pageants. Along with Miss Vietnam and Miss World Vietnam, Miss Universe Vietnam is one of the Big Three national beauty pageants.

Since 2017, the editions have been being organized frequently at the very end of odd years as opposed to the organization of Miss Vietnam on even years due to the Ministry of Culture's direction. The winner of the pageant will be crowned as the next year's Miss Universe Vietnam while one of the two Runners-up could be appointed as the following year's one if the pageant is not allowed to be held in time. Therefore, there have been two types of Miss Universe Vietnam. The crowned Miss Universe Vietnam will represent Vietnam at Miss Universe on even years while the appointed/granted Miss Universe Vietnam will represent the country on odd years.

The current Miss Universe Vietnam titleholder is Nguyễn Thị Ngọc Châu from Tây Ninh, who was crowned on June 25, 2022 in Hồ Chí Minh City. She represented Vietnam in Miss Universe 2022, but was unplaced.

History
 The 2008 Miss Universe Vietnam was held at the Vinpearl Land resort in Nha Trang on May 31, 2008. It was the first official Miss Universe Vietnam contest. Miss Vietnam Universe took place at Diamond Bay, Nha Trang, with 20 contestants participating. The final included four competitions: evening gown, swimsuit, áo dài, and interview. This was the first edition of Miss Universe Vietnam. The winner, Nguyễn Thùy Lâm, was host delegate for the Miss Universe 2008 pageant held July 14, 2008, also in Nha Trang.  She made the Top 15.
 After a 7-year hiatus, the Miss Universe Vietnam 2015 competition was held on October 3, 2015 at Crown Convention Center in Nha Trang, Vietnam. Phạm Thị Hương was the winner of the 2015 pageant.
 The selection of Miss Universe Vietnam 2017 is accompanied by a reality television series called I Am Miss Universe Vietnam, in which contestants are put through different challenges and training programs in each weekly episode. Initially, the contest finale was scheduled to be held in August 2017. However, it was subsequently pushed back to December 2, 2017. The finale was once again pushed back to January 6, 2018 amidst ongoing recovery efforts in Nha Trang - the host city - after Typhoon Damrey hit the region in early November. 70 contestants were selected for the 2017 pageant and 63 of them took part in the preliminary competition. Top 45 finalists were then chosen for the final round. Miss Universe Vietnam 2015 Phạm Thị Hương crowned her successor H'Hen Niê at the end of the event. As an ethnically Êdê person, H'Hen was the first Miss Universe Vietnam to be of an ethnic minority group.

Titleholders 

* Candidate(s) withdrawal(s) because of health problems.

Regional rankings

Titleholders under Miss Universe Vietnam org.

Miss Universe Vietnam
The winner of Miss Universe Vietnam represents her country at the Miss Universe. On occasions when the official contest was not held, a winner or a runner-up of other national beauty contests would be appointed as Miss Universe Vietnam to compete at Miss Universe by the license holder (currently, Unicorp - Hoàn Vũ Sài Gòn). Vietnam did not compete in 2006, 2007, 2010 and 2014.

Miss Supranational Vietnam

Miss Charm Vietnam

See also

 Miss Vietnam
 Miss World Vietnam
 Miss Earth Vietnam
 Miss Grand Vietnam
 Miss Supranational Vietnam
 Miss Vietnam World
 Mister Vietnam

Notes
In early 2009, Nguyễn Thùy Lâm became the first Miss Universe Vietnam Queen to be placed in Globalbeauties.com Top 100 Miss Grandslam.
In 2010, Miss Vietnam Photogenic 2002 - Phạm Thị Thanh Hằng, who competed in Miss Intercontinental 2005, was invited to participate in Miss Universe 2010. She declined due to lack of preparation time and Vietnam subsequently withdrew from the 2010 pageant.
In 2014, Nguyễn Lâm Diễm Trang, the 2nd Runner-up of Miss Vietnam 2014 was appointed to represent Vietnam at Miss Universe 2014 but withdrew at the last minute due to lack of time to prepare for the pageant.

References

Beauty pageants in Vietnam
Vietnamese awards
Vietnam

fr:Miss Vietnam#Miss Univers Vietnam